Alexander Hofmann (born 25 May 1980) is a retired Grand Prix motorcycle racer, who now works on German television coverage of the sport. He is nicknamed 'The Hoff' in English-speaking countries, a nod to David Hasselhoff.

Early years
He successfully raced in Motocross in his early teens, before entering the German 125cc championship for the first time in 1995, and the European series alongside it a year later.  In 1997 he was runner-up in the German series, and also started the German 125cc World Championship race as a wild card.

In 1998 he moved up to 250cc, winning every race in the German championship and also winning the European title, as well as coming 10th in a one-off in the 250cc World Championship.  From 1999 to 2001 Hofmann was a regular in this series, although without taking a podium finish, and missing 8 races in 2000 due to injury.

MotoGP
He started 2002 without a ride, but made his MotoGP debut as a stand-in rider for Garry McCoy at the WCM Red Bull team, also filling in for Loris Capirossi for Sito Pons' team.  He was hired to be  Kawasaki's test rider role in 2003.  In two starts, he scored points both times.  He and Shinya Nakano replaced McCoy and Andrew Pitt as full-time racers in 2004. The next two years were difficult, mainly due to injuries, partly through his love of Motocross. Points were rare and Kawasaki chose Randy de Puniet for 2006 over Hofmann.

In 2006 he joined the D'Antin Pramac team, riding on a 2006 customer version of the works Ducati alongside José Luis Cardoso. When their factory rider Sete Gibernau was injured at the Circuit de Catalunya (a race in which Alex finished 8th, helped by 3 riders not starting the resumption of the race), Hofmann was appointed as his replacement for the next 2 races, before returning to D'Antin for his home race at Sachsenring, dropping out early.

In 2007 he remained with D'Antin, alongside the veteran Alex Barros. Fifth place at Le Mans took him to 10th in the championship after five rounds, ahead of reigning champion Nicky Hayden. He was a strong 8th at Assen. Preparation for his home round at the Sachsenring were hampered by a hand injury suffered when a friend closed a car door onto it, but he scored minor points in the race.  He injured his hand in practice at Mazda Raceway Laguna Seca. He was replaced at Mazda Raceway Laguna Seca by Chaz Davies and by Iván Silva at Brno. He returned to racing at Misano but he was fired by the team following the Portuguese Grand Prix, after pulling out of the race while in with a chance of scoring points, due to a lack of motivation. He never raced again.

Personal
His girlfriend is called Romina Rados.  He loves action sports such as skiing and BMX bikes.  At 1.80m he is tall for a motorcycle racer.  His favourite food is Italian. He has a two children, a son called Travis (b. 2010) and a daughter called Sienna (b. 2014).

He is fluent in German, English, French, Spanish and Italian.

After his racing career he started working as MotoGP commentator for the German TV station Sport1, where his knowledge from his own racing career and multilingualism prove helpful. He also became a test driver, initially for Aprilia helping to develop the RSV4 and now KTM and their MotoGP project.

Career statistics

By season

By class

Races by year
(key) (Races in bold indicate pole position, races in italics indicate fastest lap)

Superbike World Championship

Races by year

References

External links

 Official website
 Bio at EastCoast wheels
 Crash.net profile

1980 births
Living people
Sportspeople from Swabia (Bavaria)
German motorcycle racers
Kawasaki Motors Racing MotoGP riders
Superbike World Championship riders
250cc World Championship riders
Pramac Racing MotoGP riders
MotoGP World Championship riders
People from Mindelheim